= 2003 Bayelsa State House of Assembly election =

Nigerian state legislative election

The 2003 Bayelsa State House of Assembly election was held on May 3, 2003, to elect members of the Bayelsa State House of Assembly in Nigeria. All the 24 seats were up for election in the Bayelsa State House of Assembly.

Seibarugu Werinipre from PDP representing Yenagoa II constituency was elected Speaker, while Nestor Binabo from PDP representing Sagbama II constituency was elected Deputy Speaker.

== Results ==
The result of the election is listed below.

- Steve Ereboh from PDP won Southern Ijaw I constituency
- Hawkins Kalabo from PDP won Southern Ijaw II constituency
- Adolphus Ofongo from PDP won Southern Ijaw III constituency
- Nimibofa Ayawei from PDP won Southern Ijaw IV constituency
- Arthur Apeti from PDP won Brass I constituency
- Michael Kumosuonyo from PDP won Brass II constituency
- Nelson Belief from PDP won Brass III constituency
- Imomotimi Fanama from PDP won Sagbama I constituency
- Bright K. A. Agagowei from PDP won Sagbama II constituency
- Williams D. Ofoni from PDP won Sagbama III constituency
- Amakiri Etebu from PDP won Kolokuma/Opokuma I constituency
- Waripamo Dudafa from PDP won Kolokuma/Opokuma II constituency
- Peremobowei Ebebi from PDP won Ekeremor I constituency
- Boyelayefa Debekeme from PDP won Ekeremor II constituency
- Dein Benadoumene from PDP won Ekeremor III constituency
- Karibo Nadu from PDP won Ogbia I constituency
- Robert Enogha from PDP won Ogbia II constituency
- Elliot Osomu from PDP won Ogbia III constituency
- Johnson S. Alalibo from PDP won Yenagoa I constituency
- Seibarugu Werinipre from PDP won Yenagoa II constituency
- Franklin Otele from PDP won Yenagoa III constituency
- Bright N. Erewari from PDP won Nembe I constituency
- Foingha Jephthah from PDP won Nembe II constituency
- Otobo Noah Opusiri from PDP won Nembe III constituency
